Wolf-Dieter Dube (13 July 1934 – 9 September 2015) was a German art historian.

Life and career 
Born in Schwerin, Dube studied art history and received his doctorate from the University of Göttingen in 1963. From 1969 on he was director of the Pinakothek der Moderne in Munich, from 1976 on also deputy director general of the Bavarian State Painting Collections. From 1983 to 1999 he was General Director of the Staatliche Museen zu Berlin/Prussian Cultural Heritage Foundation.

He made a historic contribution to the Berlin and at the same time to the German museum landscape. He gave the decisive impulse for the construction of the Gemäldegalerie am Kulturforum, and the opening of the Hamburger Bahnhof as a museum for contemporary art is also associated with his name. Dube was author of numerous specialist publications.

Dube died in Berlin at the age of 81.

Honours 

 1986: Order of Merit of the Italian Republic
 1989: Order of Merit of the Federal Republic of Germany 1st class
 1993: Commander of the Royal Norwegian Order of Merit
 1999: Ernst Ludwig Kirchner Prize
 1999: Order of Merit of Berlin

Publications (selection) 
 Süddeutsche Bronzemörser. Dissertation Universität Göttingen 1963, .
 with Annemarie Dube: Ernst Ludwig Kirchner. Das graphische Werk. 2 volumes, Prestel, Munich 1967, 2nd edition 1980, 3rd edition 1991,  (Münchner Forschungen zur Kunstgeschichte).
 Les expressionnistes.

References

Further reading 
 Internationales Biographisches Archiv 14/1999, 29 March 1999.

External links 
 
 Archives of Culture: Conversation with Wolf-Dieter Dube, Getty-Institute Newsletter, 1993

German art historians
Directors of museums in Germany
Officers Crosses of the Order of Merit of the Federal Republic of Germany
Recipients of the Order of Merit of Berlin
Commanders of the Order of Merit of the Italian Republic
1934 births
2015 deaths
People from Schwerin